I'm in the Revue is a 1950 French-Italian comedy film directed by Mario Soldati. It was shown as part of a retrospective on Italian comedy at the 67th Venice International Film Festival.

Cast
 Nino Taranto - L'Habilleur
 Isa Barzizza - Cleo, la kleptomane
 Irasema Dilián
 Louis Armstrong - Himself
 Dante Maggio
 Suzy Delair - La Chanteuse
 Fernandel - Le peintre en bâtiment dévot
 Katherine Dunham - Herself
 Vanda Osiris - Herself
 Renato Rascel
 Carlo Dapporto
 Andreina Paul
 Enrico Viarisio
 Claudio Villa
 Isa Miranda
 Borrah Minevitch - Himself

References

External links

1950 films
1950 comedy films
1950s Italian-language films
Italian black-and-white films
Films directed by Mario Soldati
Italian comedy films
French comedy films
1950s Italian films
1950s French films